Charlotte Smith (born August 23, 1973) is a retired American professional women's basketball player for the Charlotte Sting, Washington Mystics and Indiana Fever in the WNBA, and for the Colorado Xplosion and San Jose Lasers in the ABL. She is currently the women's basketball head coach at Elon University.

Playing career
After excelling as a basketball player at Shelby High School in Shelby, North Carolina, Smith played college basketball for the North Carolina Tar Heels. As a freshman, she was selected as women's basketball Rookie of the Year for the Atlantic Coast Conference.  She was named Most Outstanding Player of the NCAA Women's Division I Basketball Championship in 1994 when she hit the championship-winning shot for the Tar Heels at the buzzer.  In the same game, Smith tied an NCAA Tournament record with 23 rebounds.  She was named National College Player of the Year by ESPN in 1995, was named a first-team collegiate All-American by Kodak/WBCA and the Associated Press, and is one of only two North Carolina women's basketball players to have had her jersey retired.  She was named most valuable player of the ACC Tournament in her junior and senior years. She also became the second female college basketball player ever to dunk during a game on December 4, 1994.  In 2002, Smith was named to the ACC's Fiftieth Anniversary Team.

After her collegiate eligibility ended in 1995, Smith joined a professional basketball club in Italy.  She was named Most Valuable Player of the Italian league's All-Star game for the 1995–1996 season.

In 1996, Smith was selected by the Colorado Xplosion in the third round of the initial draft held by the newly formed ABL.  She played one season with Colorado, then was traded to the San Jose Lasers.  As a Laser, she was named to the ABL All-Star team for the 1997–1998 season.

Following the ABL's cessation of operations in 1999, Smith participated in the 1999 WNBA Draft, where the Charlotte Sting chose her with the 33rd overall pick.  She played six seasons with the Sting.  During offseasons, she interned with the Sting's front office,  worked with US Sport Management, Inc., played a second winter season in Italy in 1999–2000, and served as an UNC women's basketball  assistant coach for several seasons. Smith also earned a bachelor's degree in sociology from UNC in 1999.

Smith joined the WNBA's Washington Mystics for the 2005 season.  She was briefly affiliated with the Indiana Fever at the start of the 2006 season.

North Carolina statistics
Source

USA Basketball
Smith was named to the USA U18 team (then called the Junior World Championship Qualifying Team) in 1992. The team competed in Guanajuato, Mexico in August 1992. The team won their first four games, then lost 80–70 to Brazil, finishing with the silver medal for the event, but qualifying for the 1993 world games. Smith averaged 5.2 points per game during the event.

Smith represented the US at the 1995 World University Games held in Fukuoka, Japan in August and September 1995. The team had a record of 5–1, securing the silver medal. The USA team won early and reached a record of 5–0 when the USA beat Yugoslavia. In the semi-final game, the USA faced Russia. The team was behind much of the first half but managed to tie the game at the half. The USA broke the game open in the second half and won 101–74, with Smith recording a double-double with 14 points, 14 rebounds along with seven assists. The gold medal match was against unbeaten Italy. The Italian team started strong, scoring 12 of the first 14 points of  the contest. Sylvia Crawley scored eight consecutive points to end the first half, but that left the USA nine points behind. The USA took a small lead in the second half, but the team from Italy responded with a ten-point run, and won the game and the gold medal by a score of 73–65. Smith was the third leading scorer for the team with 13.7 points per game, and led the team in rebounds with 7.9 per game.

Smith was invited to be a member of the Jones Cup team representing the US in 1996. She helped the team to a 9–0 record, and the gold medal in the event. Smith averaged 9.7 points per game, the highest scoring average on the team, and was named the All-Tournament MVP.

Coaching career
In 2002, Charlotte Smith joined the North Carolina Tar Heels women's basketball coaching staff as an assistant coach. Smith would help lead the Tar Heels to four straight number one seeds in the NCAA Women's Division I Basketball Championship from 2005 to 2008. Her teams were ACC regular season champions in 2005, 2006 and 2008 and claimed the ACC Tournament title in 2005, 2006, 2007 and 2008. Smith was a part of two Final Four teams while on the North Carolina staff.

On June 22, 2011, Smith was named the head women's basketball coach at Elon University, becoming the sixth head coach in program history. In her first season leading the Phoenix, she set a new school record for wins by a first-year head coach. Charlotte Smith was named the 2017 CAA Coach of the Year and Elon won its first CAA Regular Season title and its first CAA Conference tournament title in Division 1 History. Elon also earned its first bid in the NCAA tournament in school history.

References

Sources
 
 

1973 births
Living people
All-American college women's basketball players
American expatriate basketball people in Italy
American women's basketball coaches
American women's basketball players
Basketball coaches from North Carolina
Basketball players from North Carolina
Charlotte Sting players
Colorado Xplosion players
Indiana Fever players
North Carolina Tar Heels women's basketball players
People from Shelby, North Carolina
San Jose Lasers players
Small forwards
Universiade medalists in basketball
Universiade silver medalists for the United States
Washington Mystics players
Medalists at the 1995 Summer Universiade
Elon Phoenix women's basketball coaches